Bajo bandera is a 1997 Argentine mystery drama film directed and written by Juan José Jusid with Guillermo Saccomanno. The film starred Miguel Ángel Solá and Federico Luppi.

The film won 7 awards and 2 nominations, including 3 Silver Condor awards at the Argentine Film Critics Association Awards
for Best Music, Best New Actor Nicolás Scarpino and Best Screenplay (Guillermo Saccomanno and Juan José Jusid). Miguel Ángel Solá was also nominated for Best Actor.

Cast
Miguel Ángel Solá as Mayor Molina
Federico Luppi as Coronel Hellman
Omero Antonutti as Padre Bruno
Daniele Liotti as Soldado Repetto
Andrea Tenuta as Fanny
Andrea Pietra as Nora
Carlos Santamaría as Capitán Roca
Alessandra Acciai as Victoria
Mónica Galán as Paula
Betiana Blum as Bonavena
Ariel Casas as Subteniente Trevi
Juan Andrés Bracelli as Lito
Nicolás Scarpino as Rosen
Rolly Serrano as Cabo Benamino
Walter Balzarini as Joaquín
Alan McCormick as Polaco
Damián Canduci as Perro

External links
 

1997 films
1990s Spanish-language films
1990s mystery drama films
Films scored by Federico Jusid
Argentine mystery drama films
1997 drama films
1990s Argentine films